Patrik Martinec (born September 4, 1971 in Jilemnice, Czechoslovakia) is a former professional ice hockey forward who played his last five seasons for Anyang Halla of the Asia League Ice Hockey, from South Korea. While playing for Halla, he earned the nickname "Grandfather" because of the age difference between him and most of the players on the team.

On June 18, 2010, Martinec was officially hired as assistant coach. He signed one-year deal. The following season he joined HC Sparta Praha as staff. He spent the first season as an assistant coach and three seasons as head coach. In May 2016 Anyang Halla announced that he was taking over as head coach from Jiří Veber. He would have taken over two years earlier, but had to see out his current contract and had suggested Veber to Anyang Halla.

Career highlights

Czech Extraliga

1998-1999 season:
Extraliga Most Assists (46)
1999-2000 season:	
Extraliga Champion
2000-2001 season:	
Extraliga Most Assists (37)
Extraliga Most Points (59)

2013-2014 season:
Extraliga Semi-finalist (Coach)

2014-2015 season:
Extraliga Semi-finalist (Coach)

2015-2016 season:
Extraliga Championship Runner-up (Coach)

Asia League Ice Hockey

2006-2007 season:	
AHIL Best Playmaking Forward
AHIL Most Assists (53)
AHIL Most Points (71)
2008-2009 season:	
AHIL Best Playmaking Forward
2009-2010 season:	
AHIL Best Playmaking Forward
AHIL Champion
AHIL Regular Season MVP

Career statistics

References
"Martinec, Joins Halla Bench" www.anyanghalla.com(English) June 18, 2010

External links
 

1971 births
Living people
Ak Bars Kazan players
HL Anyang players
Czech ice hockey centres
Czech ice hockey coaches
Czech expatriate ice hockey players in Russia
People from Jilemnice
HC Litvínov players
HC Dynamo Pardubice players
HC Slavia Praha players
HC Sparta Praha players
Stadion Hradec Králové players
Sportspeople from the Liberec Region
Czech expatriate sportspeople in South Korea
Czechoslovak ice hockey centres
Expatriate ice hockey players in South Korea
Czech expatriate ice hockey people